Panjia Union, is a union parishad of the Jessore District in the Division of Khulna, Bangladesh. It has an area of 28.72 square kilometres and a population of 30301.

References

Unions of Keshabpur Upazila